A Touch of Green is a 2015 Taiwanese period drama television series produced by Public Television Service, based on the 1971 short story of the same name by Pai Hsien-yung (which was included in his bilingual collection Taipei People). The story follows a group of Republic of China Air Force pilots and their wives during the Chinese Communist Revolution (1945–49) in mainland China and the White Terror period (1949–87) in Taiwan.

A Touch of Green won 6 awards at the 2016 Golden Bell Awards, including Best TV Series, Best Directing (Tsao Jui-yuan), and Best Actor (Wu Kang-jen).

Plot
The story takes place from 1945 to 1981, after the Japanese surrender from World War II and the Chinese Civil War.
The story focuses on three women, from their days as schoolgirls to their marriages as wives of Republic of China Air Force pilots. They follow their husbands from Nanking to Taiwan in 1949 after the retreat of the Government of the Republic of China (ROC) and Kuomintang (KMT). The story emphasizes the daily lives of the families who stayed at the military dependents' village, experiencing the pain of leaving their home and separations from friends/family. Their shared experience brings the military families together in support of one another. Through their love and bond, they survive hardships. The resulting story is motivational and touching.

The story includes:
1945－1949, Episodes 1－20, Second Sino-Japanese War, Chinese Communist Revolution (Student activism in Nanking 1946 and Liaoshen Campaign)
1954－1981, Episodes 21－31, Chinese Communist Revolution, White Terror (Taiwan), Black Bat Squadron, Black Cat Squadron

Cast
Cheryl Yang as Qin Qian-yi
Tien Hsin as Zhou Wei-xun
Weber Yang as Jiang Wei Cheng
Gaby Chun-tian Lan as Shao Zhi-jian
Wu Kang-ren as Guo Zhen 
Cindy Yu-han Lien as Zhu Qing 
Wen Chen-ling as Shao Mo-ting 
Zhuang Xin-yu as young Shao Mo-ing
Hans Chung as Gu Zhao-jun
Fan Kuang-yao as Fan Ren-xian
 as Mr. Gong 
Li Shao-jie as Wang Ying 
 as Wang Gang
Huang Shang-ho as Mr. Han, Lieutenant of 9th Brigade

Broadcast information

Awards and nominations

References

External links 

－公視
一把青LINE TV頻道
一把青 Yahoo娛樂頻道（官方海外版）

Television shows set in Taiwan
Television shows set in Zhejiang
Television shows filmed in Jiangsu
Television shows filmed in Shanghai
Television shows filmed in Taiwan
2015 Taiwanese television series debuts
2016 Taiwanese television series endings
Public Television Service original programming
Television shows based on Taiwanese novels
Taiwanese drama television series
Works about air forces
Mandarin-language television shows
Television series set in the 1940s
Television series set in the 1950s
Television series set in the 1960s
Television series set in the 1970s
Television series set in the 1980s